Ragbi klub Budućnost is a Montenegrin rugby club based in Podgorica.Rugby Club Budućnost is a part of Budućnost Podgorica sports society. The club is currently inactive as of 2015.

External links
Ragbi klub Budućnost (in Montenegrin)

References

Montenegrin rugby union teams
Budućnost Podgorica